Rolpaal is a hamlet in the Dutch province of South Holland. It is a part of the municipality of Westland, and lies about 9 km southwest of The Hague.

The statistical area "Rolpaal", which also can include the surrounding countryside, has a population of around 40.

References
 

Populated places in South Holland